The Walrus-class submarine is the only submarine class currently in operation in the Royal Netherlands Navy. The boats have been in service since 1990 and are all named after sea mammals.

History
In 1974, the Royal Netherlands Navy announced, through the Ministry of Defence's 10-year plan , that it wanted to replace its aging s. Since the 1960s, the Royal Netherlands Navy had been conducting studies and research into a suitable replacement attack submarine. This research initiative concluded that the Netherlands should build conventional diesel-electric submarines, as nuclear submarines were costly and could only be constructed, crewed, and maintained by countries with major navies such as the United States, France and the United Kingdom. Nonetheless, even with the diesel-electric submarine, the Dutch government sought to work together with international allies to reduce construction costs.

Between 1975 and 1978, the design of the Walrus-class was for the most part completed, and included many improvements which would result in new, state-of-the-art submarines that would mark a significant improvement over previous submarines used by the Royal Netherlands Navy. For example, a special kind of French-produced steel was used to construct the hull of the Walrus-class submarines; this steel proved to be more elastic, allowing submarines of the class to dive deeper than previous submarines. Furthermore, there was a focus on automation which was aimed at decreasing the manpower required to operate the submarines, while also making them more effective against threats.

On 19 June 1979, Minister of Defense Willem Scholten signed a contract worth 425 million guilders with the Rotterdamsche Droogdok Maatschappij (RDM) to build two submarines to replace the Dolfijn-class submarines, with the construction of the second boat to commence the following year. Soon, RDM noticed that the new submarines could not be built the same way as the s; it had to use new techniques to build the submarines. Furthermore, the design was constantly modified to incorporate new developments in the submarine world, which led to issues that slowed the building process. Nonetheless, construction continued and on 11 October 1979,  was laid down. Two years later, on 24 September 1981,  was laid down.

Unexpectedly, on 19 February 1983, RDM's parent company Rijn-Schelde-Verolme declared bankruptcy, despite successive governments providing 2.2 billion guilders in state aid to RSV. This was problematic because the construction of the Walrus-class submarines was far from completion. To ensure construction of the submarines continued, RDM was re-established as an independent company. Furthermore, the Royal Netherlands Navy ordered an additional two Walrus-class submarines earlier than planned to assist RDM financially. However, at this time the Walrus-class submarines were facing many problems.

New problems arose on 14 August 1986, when the command center of Walrus caught fire, while it was still on a scaffold in the shipyard. The fire lasted about five hours, and resulted in immense damage to the submarine; the command center was completely burned out. While some equipment could be rescued, most had to be replaced. This delayed the construction of the submarines once again. The costs of the resulting damage was 225 million guilders, which was fully covered by insurance. The exact location, origin and cause of the fire was never established. Presumably, the fire was caused in the vicinity of the corporals and men's washroom by a defect in the electrical work lighting. Repairs were reported as complete in 1987, but had so delayed construction of Walrus that the second submarine (with construction number 349) was put into service as the first of the class, with the name HNLMS Zeeleeuw (sea lion). HNLMS Walrus was put into service two years later. All the problems, delays and rising costs were eventually dubbed by the Dutch national parliament as the "Walrus-affair". Nonetheless, at the time of their commissioning, the Walrus-class submarines were considered to be one of the most modern and advanced conventional submarines in operation.

Design
The Walrus-class submarines are unusual in that instead of a cross-shaped assembly of stern diving planes and rudders, they mount four combined rudders and diving planes in an "X" configuration. The X configuration is a complex system and therefore not implemented by many other navies around the world.

The submarines of the Walrus-class, when submerged, are silent and therefore difficult to detect by ships, planes and other submarines once they go into hiding. This makes the boats very suitable for combating surface vessels and submarines, protecting friendly units, gathering information, providing early warning detection, and supporting special operations. The submarines can also be used to enforce international sanctions, as they did during the Yugoslav Wars.

The Walrus-class submarines were specifically designed for hunting Russian submarines during the Cold War. However, the Cold War had ended by the time they became operational. Nonetheless, they have provided excellent services in various international conflict situations in which the deployment of the Royal Netherlands Navy was requested. Since the Dutch submarines have acquired a good reputation, they are often part of international exercises, taking part in mock battles.

Operational history
After the Cold War, the submarines have been tasked with many highly confidential intelligence gathering operations, many of which are still classified. They have operated in the Northern Atlantic, Mediterranean Yugoslavian region, the Persian Gulf at Iran and Iraq, and the Caribbean, often upon the request of allies, including the United States.

In June 2010, the Netherlands agreed to deploy one submarine to help combat piracy off the coast of Somalia.

Submarine command course
The Walrus-class submarines are used for the Submarine Command Course (SMCC) for both national and international candidates (including the UK, Australia and Canada), selecting and training future commanders of conventional submarines. They are highly rated, with an exceptional reputation. The Royal Netherlands Navy began this course after the British Royal Navy phased out their conventional submarines.

Upgrade program

In 2007, the Dutch cabinet approved an upgrade of the four operational submarines and recruitment of additional crew to improve overall operational availability. The upgrades were focused on near-shore operations and integration with new weapons, and include:
 the migration from the MK 48 mod-4 torpedo to the mod-7 version
 replacing one periscope with a non-hull-penetrating optronic mast from L-3 KEO which enables the submarine to capture HD footage, both day and night
 addition of a mine and obstacle avoidance sonar by ELAC Nautik
 refurbishing of the pressure hull
 introduction of a new combat management system
 modifications to support special operations forces

In 2013, the contract for the Walrus-class (IP-W) Conservation Program was signed. The program covers the preservation of the pressure skin, the replacement of the sonar, navigation periscope and GIPSY combat system, improved communication systems and adaptations to a number of platform systems. All four boats must be modernized by 2019. With the conservation program, boats can be kept operational until mid-2025. The cost of upgrading the four submarines is estimated to be 94 million euros. The upgrade of Zeeleeuw took longer than expected. Initially the upgrade was expected to have been completed by 2015, but it took until 2016 before the submarine was ready for service again. Currently, Bruinvis is being upgraded at the Den Helder naval base. The Dutch navy has also begun to prepare for the replacement of the Walrus-class submarines.

Replacement

In November 2014, the Dutch Minister of Defence announced plans to replace the Walrus-class submarines in 2025. By 2017, there was still no political agreement on the quantity or type of new submarines to be ordered, nor the tasks they were expected to perform. However, it seems certain that they will be replaced, since the alleged Russian threat was regarded an incentive to invest in a new class. The Minister of Defence, however, delayed the replacement by two years, until 2027. Roughly, there are two groups in the Dutch parliament – one in favor of replacing the Walrus-class by an equally capable class of large, expeditionary, diesel-electric submarine, and the other in favor of choosing a cheaper solution of smaller diesel-electrics, similar to Swedish and German submarines. It is unknown where the new boats will be built; since the Dutch RDM shipyard (the only Dutch yard capable of building submarines) is no longer in operation. The Defensienota (Defense policy for the coming years) of March 2018 revealed that the Dutch government is still planning to replace the Walrus-class submarines, with an allocated budget of more than 2.5 billion euros for the new submarines. Additional information on how to proceed with the replacement was expected at the end of 2018, when the Dutch Minister of Defence, Ank Bijleveld, was to send a so-called B-letter to the Dutch parliament. Minister Bijleveld also underlined in an interview that the new submarines should have the same niche capabilities as the current Walrus-class submarines: the ability to operate and gather intelligence in both shallow water close to the coast and in deep water in the ocean. In mid-2021 it was indicated that a revised plan envisaged taking a replacement decision in 2022 and to have the first vessel in service by 2028, with the first two boats to be in service by 2031. However, in October 2021 it was reported that this timeline was no longer feasible. Instead, the Dutch Ministry of Defence signalled that the envisaged dates would have to be "substantially adjusted", possibly incorporating a life extension refit for the existing Walrus-class boats.

In April 2022 it was announced that two of the Walrus-class boats would be extended in service until the mid-2030s and that in order to do so safely a different maintenance approach would have to be adopted for the entire fleet with one of the four existing boats to be decommissioned in the short-term, followed by a second boat later. On 16 November 2022 it was revealed that Walrus will be the first boat to be decommissioned sometime in 2023. The revised schedule for the construction of the new replacement boats would likely see the first two vessels entering service in the 2034 to 2037 timeframe.

Contenders 
The Ministry of Defence has shortlisted three bidders:
 Damen Group and Saab Group announced that they have partnered from 2015 to jointly develop, offer and build next-generation submarines that are able to replace the current Walrus-class submarines. It was announced on 1 June 2018 that their design will be derived from the A26 submarine. Furthermore, the weight will be around 2900 tonnes, complementing 34 to 42 people. The boat's armament includes 6 torpedo tubes and 1 multi-mission lock which can be used to deploy special forces.
 Naval Group announced that it is offering its newest submarine class, the Barracuda-class, as replacement for the Walrus-class. A version of the "Shortfin" diesel-electric variant Barracuda-class will be offered, rather than the nuclear variant used by the French Navy.
 ThyssenKrupp Marine Systems is planning to offer a Type 212CD submarine.

Spain's Navantia's S-80 was not accepted as a contender following the B-letter in 2019. In 2022 the Spanish Ministry of Defence send a letter to the Dutch DMO for Navantia to be allowed to put in an offer following the announcement that a RFQ will be sent to the remaining contenders, in which some of the requirements have changed. It is rumoured that the request was denied by DMO. 

On 16 November 2022 the RFQ was sent out to the three remaining shipyards. It is expected they will submit their bids around the summer of 2023.

Ships in class 
All boats were built by RDM.

See also
 List of submarine classes in service
 Royal Netherlands Navy Submarine Service

References

Bibliography
 KVMO, "Nut en noodzaak onderzeeboten: deltaplan voor defensie" Marineblad Maart 2016 nr 2 Jaargang 126.
 
 
 Om de veiligheid van het bestaan: defensiebeleid in de jaren 1974-1983, H. Vredeling, C.L.J. van Lent, A. Stemerdink. Defensienota 1974. Kamerstuknummer 12994 ondernummer 14. .

Further reading

External links 

 Walrus-class submarines

Submarine classes